This timeline of eurypterid research is a chronologically ordered list of important fossil discoveries, controversies of interpretation, and taxonomic revisions of eurypterids, a group of extinct aquatic arthropods closely related to modern arachnids and horseshoe crabs that lived during the Paleozoic Era.

The scientific study of eurypterids began in the early 19th century when James E. DeKay recognized a fossil that had previously been described as that of a fish as arthropod in nature. Though DeKay erroneously believed the fossil to represent a crustacean and a missing link between trilobites and branchiopods, the fossil became the type species of first ever eurypterid to be scientifically described, Eurypterus remipes, in 1825.

Over 250 species of eurypterids in 74 recognized valid genera have been described since the discovery of Eurypterus remipes. The most recent genus to be described is Terropterus (2021) and the most recent species is its type species Terropterus xiushanensis (2021).

19th century

1810s 
1818

 The first eurypterid fossil to be discovered is unearthed in rocks in New York of Silurian age. It is described by Dr. S. L. Mitchill as an example of the fish Silurus, possibly due to the catfish-like appearance of its carapace.

1820s 
1825

 James E. DeKay recognized the fossil described by Mitchill as an arthropod and named it Eurypterus remipes, the first eurypterid to be described scientifically. DeKay interpreted the animal as a crustacean and as the missing link between trilobites and branchiopods.

1830s 

1831

 John Scouler examines and figures fossil remains from Lower Carboniferous Scotland which will later be referred to Hibbertopterus scouleri.
Scouler described the genus Eidothea based on a single fossil without designating a species name.

1836

Samuel Hibbert describes the species Eurypterus scouleri, later transferred to its own genus, Hibbertopterus.
Scouler's Eidothea is discovered to be pre-occupied by a genus of plant, his fossil is found to be similar to Eurypterus scouleri.

1838

 Stepan S. Kutorga described the species Limulus oculatus as an extinct horseshoe crab.

1839

 Louis Agassiz described the new genus Pterygotus, believing the fossils to represent a large fish.

1840s 

1843
 Burmeister created the family Eurypteridae to contain Eurypterus.

1844

 Agassiz recognized Pterygotus as an arthropod after the discovery of more complete remains, he classified it as a crustacean of the Entomostraca subclass.
1849

 Agassiz described the species Pterygotus anglicus.

1850s 

1851

 Hermann Jordan excavates the first fossils of the genus Adelophthalmus.

1852

 John William Salter described the species Pterygotus problematicus.
1854

 Jordan and Hermann von Meyer describe the new species and genus Adelophthalmus granosus.

1855

 August Emanuel von Reuss described the new species and genus Lepidoderma imhofi.

1856

Salter described the new genus Himantopterus (the genus name was replaced in 1859 by Erettopterus) and the new species H. acuminatus, H. banksii, H. bilobus, H. lanceolatus, H. maximus and H. perornatus.
Salter described the species Pterygotus acuminata.
Page transferred Pterygotus acuminata to its own genus, Slimonia.
Page named and figured, but did not thoroughly describe, the genus Stylonurus.

1859
 Hall describes the species Pterygotus marcophthalmus. It will later be considered part of the genus Acutiramus.
 Hall describes the species Pterygotus osborni.
Hall describes the species Pterygotus cobbi.
Salter names a subgenus of Pterygotus, Erettopterus, for species with a bilobed telson.
Salter described the species Slimonia stylops.
Salter described the species Eurypterus abbreviatus.
Salter described the species Pterygotus ludensis.
Salter described the species Pterygotus punctatus.
Salter described the species Eurypterus pygmaeus, later recognized as representing fossils of Nanahughmilleria.
Salter and Thomas Henry Huxley describe the fossil specimens that will later be named Necrogammarus salweyi, believing them to represent some sort of crustacean.

1860s

1860

 Edouard D'Eichwald recognized Kutorga's Limulus oculatus to be highly distinct from Limulus and created the generic name Campylocephalus to contain the species.

1861

 John William Dawson named a new species of plant, Selaginites formosus.
1865
Henry Woodward described the genus Stylonurus (named and figured, but not thoroughly described, by David Page in 1856) and raised the rank of the Eurypteridae to that of order, effectively creating the Eurypterida as the taxonomic unit it is seen as today.
1866
Woodward created the subclass Merostomata to contain eurypterids and xiphosurans.
Ernst Haeckel classified the Merostomata (containing virtually only the Eurypterida) and Xiphosura within a group he named Gigantostraca within the crustaceans. "Gigantostraca" is later treated as a synonym of Mersostomata.

1868

 Salter described the species Pterygotus taurinus.
Woodward described the species Eurypterus obesus.
Woodward described the species Eurypterus scorpioides.
Fielding Bradford Meek and Amos Henry Worthen described the new species and genus Anthraconectes mazonensis. Anthraconectes was designated a subgenus of Eurypterus.

1870s 

1870

 Henry Woodward described the species Necrogammarus salweyi, believing it to represent an amphipod.

1871

 Dawson reclassified his plant Selaginites formosus as a eurypterid.

1872

 Barrande describes Pterygotus bohemicus, later considered part of the genus Acutiramus, P. kopaninensis and P. nobilis.
Walcott described the genus and species Echinognathus clevelandi.
1873

 Friedrich Goldenberg coined the name Polyzosternites to replace Adelophthalmus.
1874

 Samuel Almond Miller described the new genus and species Megalograptus welchi, mistakenly believing the fragmentary fossils to represent a graptolite.

1875

 Grote and Pitt describe Pterygotus cummingsi, later considered the type species of Acutiramus.
Grote and Pitt describe the species Eusarcus scorpionis.
1877

 Dionýs Štúr described the species Eurypterus salmi, later referred to Campylocephalus.
Meek and Worthen described the species Eurypterus pennsylvanicus, later referred to Adelophthalmus.
Hall described the species Eurypterus mansfieldi, later referred to Adelophthalmus.

1879

John William Dawson described the species Erettopterus canadensis.

1880s 

1881
 Pohlman described the species Pterygotus buffaloensis. It is later synonymized with P. cummingsi.
Pohlman described the species Erettopterus grandis.
The type and only known specimen of Tylopterella boylei (first named Eurypterus boylei) is discovered.
1882

 Ben Peach named the genus Glyptoscorpius to include some fossils from the Carboniferous of Scotland, including the species G. perornatus, G. caledonicus and G. kidstoni. He mistakenly believed the fossils to represent the remains of scorpions.

1883

Carl Friedrich Schmidt described the species Erettopterus osiliensis.
1884

 The holotype and only known specimen of Vernonopterus minutisculptus is discovered.
Joseph Frederick Whiteaves described the species Eurypterus boylei.
Hall described the species Eurypterus prominens.
1888

 Hall and Clarke described the species Eurypterus approximatus, later referred to Adelophthalmus.
 Woodward described the species Eurypterus wilsoni, later referred to Adelophthalmus.

1889

Matthew described the new genus and species Bunodella horrida as a crustacean.
Dewalque described the species Eurypterus lohesti.

1890s 

1890

 Edward Waller Claypole described the genus and species Eurysoma newlini. Later that same year he discovered Eurysoma to be pre-occupied, and coined the replacement name Carcinosoma.
Pereira de Lima described the species Eurypterus douvillei, later referred to Adelophthalmus.

1893

 In the work Anatomy and Relations of the Eurypterida (1893), Malcolm Laurie added considerably to the knowledge and discussion of eurypterid anatomy and relations. He focused on how the eurypterids related to each other and to trilobites, crustaceans, scorpions, other arachnids and horseshoe crabs.
1896
Gerhard Holm described the species Eurypterus fischeri. His description was so elaborate that the species became one of the most completely known of all extinct animals, so much so that the knowledge of E. fischeri was comparable with the knowledge of its modern relatives (such as the Atlantic horseshoe crab). The description also helped solidify the close relationship between the eurypterids and other chelicerates by showcasing numerous homologies between the two groups.
Samuel Almond Miller and William Frank Eugene Gurley described the species Eurypterus kokomoensis, later considered the type species of the genus Onychopterella.

1898

 Semper described the species Pterygotus barrandei and Eurypterus acrocephalus.

1899

 Laurie described the species Slimonia dubia.
Laurie described the species Eurypterus scoticus.
McCoy described the species Pterygotus australis, the first eurypterid known from Australia.
Fraipont described the species Eurypterus dewalquei.

20th century

1900s

1901
Charles Emerson Beecher described the new genus and species Strabops thacheri as the only Cambrian eurypterid.
1902

 Sarle described the species Pterygotus monroensis.

1903

Clifton J. Sarle described the new species Pterygotus monroensis and Eurypterus pittsfordensis. The new genus and species Hughmilleria socialis with the variety H. socialis var. robusta is also described.
1905

 Peach described the new species Glyptoscorpius minutisculptus.

1907

John Mason Clarke described the new species Pterygotus otisius, Hughmilleria shawangunk, Eurypterus maria, E. myops, E. cicerops and E. cestrotus.
Woodward described the species Eurypterus moyseyi, later referred to Adelophthalmus.
1908

 Ruedemann recognizes that Megalograptus is an eurypterid, rather than a graptolite.

1910s

1911
 Johan Aschehoug Kiær described the species Eurypterus norvegica.

1912

 Ruedemann and Clarke publish The Eurypterida of New York, wherein several new speciesand taxonomic groupings are created. New species described are Eurypterus megalops, Eurypterus pristinus, Eurypterus ranilarva, Eurypterus stellatus, Eusarcus longiceps, Eusarcus triangulatus, Eusarcus vaningeni, Dolichopterus frankfortensis, Dolichopterus latifrons, Dolichopterus siluriceps, Dolichopterus testudineus, Dolichopterus stylonuroides, Stylonurus limbatus, Ctenopterus multispinosus, Drepanopterus longicaudatus, Hughmilleria magna, Pterygotus atlanticus, Erettopterus globiceps, Pterygotus nasatus and Pterygotus prolificus. They also name the genus Tylopterus (later Tylopterella) and the family Pterygotidae. There are also numerous taxonomic revisions. Eurypterus obesus and E. acrocephalus are referred to the genus Eusarcus. The genus Carcinosoma, to which the species Eurypterus scorpioides and Eurypterus scoticus are transferred, is designated as a junior synonym of Eusarcus. The species Eurypterus kokomoensis is raised to the subgeneric level under the subgenus name Onychopterus.

1914

 Otto Jaekel described the new species Pterygotus rhenaniae, later designated as the type species of Jaekelopterus.
Erwin H. Barbour described the new species Anthraconectes nebraskensis. The discovery helped reinforce the idea as Adelophthalmus (or Anthraconectes) as a freshwater animal.

1915

 Xavier Stainier described the species Eurypterus dumonti, later referred to Adelophthalmus.
Ellis W. Shuler described the species Stylonurus (Ctenopterus) alveolatus, later referred to Megalograptus.

1916

Thomas Edmund Savage described the species Eurypterus pumilus.

1920s

1920

 Amadeus William Grabau described the species Anthraconectes chinensis.

1921

 Ruedemann described the new species Pterygotus vernonensis.
Ruedemann described the species Hughmilleria phelpsae, later designated as the type species of Pittsfordipterus.
1922

 Walter A. Bell described the species Anthraconectes brasdorensis.

1924

 Carl Owen Dunbar described the species Anthraconectes sellardsi.

1926

 Embrik Strand described the species Pterygotus siemiradzkii.

1930s

1933

 Boris Isidorovich Chernyshev described the species Eurypterus carbonarius, later referred to Adelophthalmus.

1934

 Eusarcus is recognized as a pre-occupied name by Størmer, who transfers its species to the next oldest available name, Carcinosoma.
Størmer describes the species Hughmilleria patteni.

1935

 Ruedemann names new subgenera of Pterygotus: Curviramus and Acutiramus. They are differentiated by the curvature of denticles in their chelicerae.

1936

 Størmer provides a more comprehensive and detailed description of Pterygotus rhenaniae.
Etheridge, Jr. described the species Glyptoscorpius stevensoni.

1938

 Carl E. Decker described the species Anthraconectes oklahomensis.

1939

Gilbert Oscar Raasch referred Strabops to the order Aglaspida.
Roy Woodhouse Pocock and A. J. Butler discover a relatively complete telson of Eurypterus abbreviatus, showing that the species was highly distinct from other species referred to the genus.
Pruvost described the species Anthraconectes corneti.

1940s

1942

 Strand proposes the replacement name Eusarcana for Eusarcus but it is ignored since Carcinosoma is already in use as the replacement name.

1948

 Kjellesvig-Waering described the new species Pterygotus ventricosus, later considered the type species of Ciurcopterus.
Kjellesvig-Waering raised the subgenus Onychopterus to the rank of a separate genus. He also assigned the species Eurypterus pumilus to the genus.
Boris Isidorovich Chernyshev described the new species Unionopterus anastasiae.

1950s

1950
Kjellesvig-Waering described the new species Hughmilleria bellistriata.
Kjellesvig-Waering described the new species Pterygotus floridanus.

1951
Kjellesvig-Waering described the new family Hughmilleriidae, composed of Hughmilleria, Slimonia, Grossopterus, Lepidoderma, Hastimima and the new genus Salteropterus abbreviatus (formerly a species of Eurypterus), leaving the Pterygotidae monotypic.
Størmer concluded that Campylocephalus and Hibbertopterus were congeneric. The fossils that had been referred to Ediothea were recognized as representatives of Campylocephalus.
Størmer noted that the name Onychopterus was pre-occupied and coined the replacement name Onychopterella.
Kjellesvig-Waering coined the replacement name Tylopterella for the genus Tylopterus, as the name Tylopterus was found to be preoccupied.
Augusta and Pribyl described the species Ctenopterus ostraviensis.

1952

 Přibyl described the species Anthraconectes zadrai.

1953

 Russell described the new species Pterygotus gaspesiensis.

1955

 Kjellesvig-Waering describes the new genus and species Dorfopterus angusticollis as part of Stylonuridae.
 Kjellesvig-Waering and Caster describe the species Acutiramus floweri.
 Kjellesvig-Waering describes the species Acutiramus suwanneensis.
Kjellesvig-Waering and Caster revise the genus Megalograptus after more complete fossils are recovered of a new species, M. ohioensis.

1956

 Fredrik Herman van Oyen designate Anthraconectes, Glyptoscorpius, Lepidoderma and Polyzosternites as junior synonyms of Adelophthalmus.

1957

Pirozhnikov described two new species, Rhenopterus matarakensis and R. schiraensis.
Kjellesvig-Waering and Størmer describe the new species Pterygotus howelli, which would later be assigned to Jaekelopterus.
Waterston gives a more complete description of Glyptoscorpius minutisculptus and refers it to Eurypterus as Eurypterus minutisculptus.
1958
Kjellesvig-Waering reaffirmed the status of Tylopterella as a separate genus from Eurypterus.
Kjellesvig-Waering publishes a study which determines the coloration of Carcinosoma newlini; showing that it was light brown with darker scales and appendages and a black telson and spines.

1959

 Kjellesvig-Waering recognized Campylocephalus as being distinct from Eurypterus scouleri and erected the genus Hibbertopterus to contain E. scouleri.
Adelophthalmus oklahomensis is designated a junior synonym of Adelophthalmus sellardsi.

1960s

1961
Kjellesvig-Waering described the new species Salteropterus longilabium, Pterygotus (Pterygotus) denticulatus, P. (P.) grandidentatus, P. (P.) lightbodyi, Carcinosoma harleyi and Dolichopterus bulbosus. The new genus Parahughmilleria is described with P. salteri as the type species. Hughmilleria bellistriata, H. phelpsae and Eurypterus maria are moved to this genus. The subgenus Erettopterus is regarded as a new genus and is separated into two new subgenera, E. (Erettopterus), including the new species E. (E.) brodiei, E. (E.) marstoni and E. (E.) spatulatus, and E. (Truncatiramus), including the new subspecies E. (T.) gigas megalodon. The genus Hughmilleria is split into two new subgenera, H. (Hughmilleria) and H. (Nanahughmilleria).
Kjellesvig-Waering transfers the species Pterygotus punctatus to Carcinosoma as Pterygotus punctatum.
1962
 Nestor Ivanovich Novozhilov names the genus Rhinocarcinosoma to contain the species R. vaningeni and R. cicerops, previously referred to Eusarcus (Paracacinosoma).

1964

 Charles D. Waterston names the genus Jaekelopterus to contain the species Pterygotus rhenaniae.
Kjellesvig-Waering described the species Pterygotus impacatus and Pterygotus lanarkensis.
Kjellesvig-Waering described the species Pterygotus marylandicus.
Kjellesvig-Waering questionably assigned Selaginites formosus to Pterygotus as Pterygotus formosus.
Caster and Khellesvig-Waering recognize Eusarcus and Carcinosoma to represent distinct genera and since Eusarcus is pre-occupied, they coin the replacement name Paracarcinosoma for its species.
Caster and Kjellesvig-Waering described the species Eocarcinosoma batrachophthalmus.
Caster and Kjellesvig-Waering describe two new species of Megalograptus, M. williamsae and M. shideleri. They also assign the species M. alveolatus, named as a species of Ctenpterus, to Megalograptus.

1966

Kjellesvig-Waering and Willard P. Leutze described the new species Bassipterus virginicus (a new genus), Drepanopterus nodosus and Erettopterus (Truncatiramus) exophthalmus. The species H. (N.) phelpsae is classified as a new genus, Pittsfordipterus. Rhenopterus matarakensis is assigned to Parahughmilleria, R. schiraensis is assigned to Hughmilleria (Nanahughmilleria).
1968
Nestor Ivanovich Novojilov classifies Slimonia into a new family of its own, the Slimonidae.
Waterston re-examines Eurypterus minutisculptus and concludes that it represents a genus of its own, which he names Vernonopterus.
Størmer and Waterston re-examine the fossil species referred to Glyptoscorpius and name the new genus Cyrtoctenus, containing the species C. caledonicus, C. dewalquei (previously Eurypterus), C. ostraviensis (previously Ctenopterus) and C. peachi. They also name the genus Dunsopterus to contain the species G. stevensoni.

1969
Størmer described the species Rhenopterus sievertsi.

1970s

1971

 Kjellesvig-Waering described the species Erettopterus serricaudatus and Erettopterus carinatus.
Bermudo Meléndez described the species Lepidoderma asturica.

1973

 Kjellesvig-Waering described the species Slimonia boliviana.

1974

 Størmer creates the family Jaekelopteridae to contain Jaekelopterus. This family has subsequently been treated as synonymous with the Pterygotidae.
Størmer raises the Pterygotus subgenus Acutiramus and the Erettopterus subgenus Truncatiramus to the level of separate genera.

1979

 Kjellesvig-Waering described the new genus and species Holmipterus suecicus.
 Waterston creates the family Parastylonuridae and includes Hardieopterus, Parastylonurus and, tentatively, Dorfopterus and Lamontopterus on it.

1980s

1980
Mario Hünicken described the new genus and species Megarachne servinei as a mygalomorph spider.
1981

 Barry S. Kues and Kenneth K. Kietzke described the species Adelophthalmus luceroensis.

1983

 Roy E. Plotnick reassigns the species Eurypterus lohesti to Adelophthalmus and renders Dorfopterus an incertae sedis genus within Eurypterida.

1985

 John E. Almond examined the Necrogammarus fossil, believing it to represent an early aquatic relative of the Uniramia subphylum of arthropods.
Alexey G. Ponomarenko described the species Hibbertopterus permianus, the last known surviving eurypterid.
Waterston, Oelofsen and Oosthuizen describe Cyrtoctenus wittebergensis.
Jones and Kjellesvig-Waering publish a study on eurypterids from Arctic Canada.

1986

Paul Selden recognizes the fossil remains of Necrogammarus, previously believed to possibly represent a crustacean or a millipede, to be fragmentary fossils of a pterygotid eurypterid.
1989
Salteropterus is placed in the family Slimonidae by Tollerton.
Tollerton publishes a major taxonomic revision of the Eurypterida, dividing it into suborders Eurypterina and Ptergotina and recognizing some eurypterids, such as the hibbertopterids, as outside the order and part of a distinct order he calls Cyrtoctenida. Modern research favors suborders Eurypterina and Stylonurina instead.
The fossil that will later be designated as the holotype of Rhinocarcinosoma dosonensis is discovered in northern Vietnam and initially misidentified as a chasmataspidid.

1990s
1992

 Ciurca reported specimens of Rhinocarcinosoma and Paracarcinosoma from elsewhere in the United States, the genera previously mainly being known from fossils found in New York State.
1993

 Further fossils of Rhinocarcinosoma are collected in northern Vietnam which will later form the basis of the new species R. dosonensis.

1994

 Chlupáč describes the species Acutiramus perneri.

1995
Braddy, Richard John Aldridge and Johannes N. Theron described the species Onychopterella augusti.

21st century

2000s

2002

 Braddy, Selden and Truong described the species Rhinocarcinosoma dosonensis.

2003
 Tollerton revises the Ordovician eurypterid genera of New York, determining that many of them are based on pseudofossils and thus invalid.

2004

 Poschmann reassigned the species Rhenopterus sievertsi to Adelophthalmus.

2005

Selden, Corronca and Hünicken recognized Megarachne servinei as a mycteroptid eurypterid.
2006
Tetlie interpreted Hughmilleria banksii as a new genus, Herefordopterus. In addition, the species Hughmilleria acuminata was synonymized with Herefordopterus banksii.
Evgenyi S. Shpinev described the species Adelophthalmus irinae.

2007
Tetlie, Selden & Ren described the new species Hughmilleria wangi.
Miller and Tetlie determine that Bunodella represents an indeterminate species of Acutiramus. However, it is not formally synonymized and is regarded as a nomen dubium.
Poschmann and Tetlie determine that Jaekelopterus was a highly derived pterygotid, not a basal form as previously assumed. It is declared to represent the largest known eurypterid.
Tetlie described the new species Pterygotus sarlei.
Ciurca and Tetlie transfer the species Pterygotus waylandsmithi to Erettopterus. Additionally, they concluded that P. monroensis was synonymous with E. osiliensis.
Tetlie suggests that Dorfopterus might represent a telson of Strobilopterus princetonii and tentatively synonymizes Dorfopterus into the species.

2008

 Tetlie and Poschmann reclassify Hughmilleria patteni as part of its own genus, Eysyslopterus.

2009

Tetlie and Briggs erect the new genus Ciurcopterus to contain species Pterygotus ventricosus and Pterygotus sarlei.

2010s

2012
Shpinev described the new species Parahughmilleria longa and Nanahughmilleria notosibirica.
Shpinev described the new species Adelophthalmus kamyshtensis and Adelophthalmus dubius.
Lamsdell publishes a phylogenetic analysis which finds Merostomata to be invalid, as Xiphosura is paraphyletic, and finds eurypterids to be more closely related to arachnids than to horseshoe crabs.
Jason A. Dunlop and Lamsdell pointed out that Eusarcana holds priority over Paracarcinosoma as a replacement name for Eusarcus, designating Paracarcinosoma as a junior synonym of Eusarcana.
Lamsdell reassigned Hibbertopterus permianus to Campylocephalus as Campylocephalus permianus.
2013

 Lamsdell, Simonetto and Selden described the species Adelophthalmus piussii, the first eurypterid to be discovered in Italy.
 Tetlie's suggestion that Dorfopterus is a telson of Strobilopterus princetonii is put into question by Lamsdell and Selden.

2015

Poschmann transferred Erieopterus statzi to the genus Parahughmilleria. The new genus and species Wiedopterus noctua is described.
Lamsdell et al. described the new genus and species Pentecopterus decorahensis, the oldest eurypterid known to date.
McCoy, Lamsdell, Poschmann, Anderson and Briggs conduct a study on the eyes of pterygotid eurypterids and determine that the genera included in the family, such as Jaekelopterus, Acutiramus and Ptergyotus, had divergent adaptations, suggesting they had different ecological roles despite their close outward resemblance.

2017
Vrazo & Ciurca described the new ichnogenus and ichnospecies Arcuites bertiensis, interpreted as traces of a swimming eurypterid.
2018
Plax et al. described the new genus and species Soligorskopterus tchepeliensis.
Shpinev & Filimonov described the new species Adelophthalmus khakassicus.
2019
Emily Hughes concludes that the genera Cyrtoctenus and Dunsopterus represent junior synonyms of Hibbertopterus.
Schoenemann, Poschmann and Clarkson publish a study comparing the eyes of Jaekelopterus with those of horseshoe crabs, arachnids and other arthropods.
Naugolnykh and Areshin describe the new species Soligorskopterus shpinevi.

2020s
2020
Russell D. C. Bicknell, Patrick M. Smith and Poschmann classify the species Pterygotus australis as a nomen dubium.
Poschmann describes the new genus and species Pruemopterus salgadoi.
Lamsdell et al. describe the new species Adelophthalmus pyrrhae.

2021
Brandt publishes a study on the possible relationships between eurypterid morphology, the ease with which members of this group experienced ecdysis and the longevity of eurypterid species.
Wang et al. describe Terropterus xiushanensis, to date the most recently described eurypterid genus and species.

See also
List of eurypterid genera
History of paleontology
Timeline of paleontology

References

External links
 

eurypterid
Eurypterida